Anthony Lewis  (born 31 March 1983) is an English actor.

Career
Lewis began acting at 9 years old, with roles in television series including Heartbeat, A Touch Of Frost and Cracker, as well as in the film Girls' Night. Regular roles in Children's Ward (as Scott Morris for three series) and Adam's Family Tree (as Adam for two series) followed, as well as the lead in the show My Dad's a Boring Nerd. He went on to appear in the ITV soap opera Emmerdale, where he portrayed the role of Marc Reynolds for three years, making a three episode guest return five years after his initial departure.

After leaving Emmerdale, Lewis performed in Broken Voices at the Tristan Bates Theatre in London. Other work includes appearances in the television series Dalziel and Pascoe and Respectable, and the film Boy A, and a starring role in the science-fiction series show Torchwood as the young World War I soldier Tommy Brockless. He also performed across the UK as Lomper in the 2016/2017 UK Tour of The Full Monty.

Outside of acting, Lewis also provides continuity announcements for BBC One and BBC Two.

Personal life
He has two brothers, Chris Lewis and actor Matthew Lewis. Anthony attended St. Mary's Menston. 

In 2019, Lewis married his wife Samantha with whom he has a son River Lewis (born 2018).

Filmography
Ackley Bridge (2018)        
Nutritiously Nicola (2018)
Undercliffe (2017)
Make It Plumb (2017)
Casualty (2013)
The Syndicate (2012)
Frankenstein's Wedding (2011)
Everything But The Ball (2010)
A Passionate Woman (2009)
Torchwood (2008)
Boy A (2007)
Respectable (2006)
Hollyoaks (2006)
Girls In Love (2005)
Holby City (2004 and 2011)
Doctors (2004, 2011 and 2023)
Dalziel and Pascoe (2004)
Attitude (Lead Presenter) (2002–2003)
Emmerdale (1999–2002, 2007)
Girls' Night (1998)
Adam's Family Tree (1997–1998)
My Dad's A Boring Nerd (1997)
Children's Ward (1996–1998)
Cardiac Arrest (1996)
A Touch of Frost (1996)
The Detectives (1995)
Cracker (1995)
Heartbeat (1994)

See also
List of Emmerdale characters

References

External links
Anthony Lewis Official Spotlight CV Profile Page

 http://www.bbc.co.uk/comedy/guide/talent/l/lewis_anthony.shtml

English male television actors
English male child actors
Male actors from Leeds
1983 births
Living people
People educated at St. Mary's Catholic High School, Menston
20th-century English male actors
21st-century English male actors
English male film actors